Deportes Savio Fútbol Club, commonly known as Deportes Savio, is a professional Honduran football club based in Santa Rosa de Copán. The club was founded in 1974, and participates in the Liga Nacional de Fútbol Profesional de Honduras. In 2006–07 they achieved the promotion to the top league of the Honduran League.

History
 They changed their name to Santo Domingo Savio in 1971, when Padre Chavarría was in charge of the team and wanted it to be a part of the Instituto Santo Domingo Savio in Santa Rosa de Copán. In 1995, a board of new directors bought the category of Deportes Progreseño of Segunda division and changed the name of the club to Deportes Savio.

Deportes Savio was promoted to Liga Nacional de Futbol de Honduras for the first time in the 1999–2000 season but were relegated back down to Liga de Ascenso de Honduras after they finished in last place in the 2001–02 season. The team managed to earn a second promotion to Liga Nacional de Honduras by defeating Arsenal in the 2006–07 Liga de Ascenso promotion playoff.

In 2007, although they did not make the play-offs in their return to the top league, Deportes Savio was very successful, finishing fifth place in the standings and becoming the third best team with the highest average attendance.

Deportes Savio started the 2012, season in danger of being dropped from the Liga Nacional again. In the second tournament of the 2012 season (La Apertura), ownership of the team was assumed by Transfer Field Company (TFC). Changes in management and addition of new players led to a remarkable improvement in the team's position: they finished the season in 6th position with an undefeated home game record, after having reached the playoffs for the first time in the club's history.

TFC's President Eduar Mafla Canizalez, has a plan to build upon the recent success of Deportes Savio both within Honduras and around the world. The company has invested more than 2 million Lempiras in the team, particularly in business development.  Recently Deportes Savio made an agreement with Banco De Occidente to increase their sponsorship of the team for the 2013–2014 season to 1.800.000 Lempiras.

In April 2014, the club was relegated to the Honduran second division after a 0–2 reverse at Olimpia.

Achievements
Segunda División / Liga de Ascenso
Winners (3): 1999–2000, 2004–05 A, 2006–07 A
Runners-up (3): 2002–03, 2004–05 C, 2015–16 A

League performance

All-time record vs. opponents
 As of 2011–12 Apertura

All Time Top goalscorers
(As of March 2014), Liga Nacional only
 Ney Costa (44 goals)
 Elroy Smith (13 goals)
 Juan Ramón Mejíaa (13 goals)
 Luis Ramírez (13 goals)
 Romario Pinto (12 goals
 Alex Roberto Bailey (12 goals)
 Reynaldo Pineda (11 goals)
 Aly Arreola (9 goals)
 Harrison Róchez (8 goals)

Most appearances
 Johnny Galdámez (178 matches)

Current squad
2013 Apertura

Former managers
  René Flores (2000–2001)
  Hernán García (2001–2002)
  Sergio Roberto Flores
  David Aquiles (2002)
  Carlos Martínez (2008–2009)
  Santos Gonzales
  Carlos Jurado (Aug 2009 – Mar 2010)
  Hernán García (Mar 2010 – Oct 2012)
  Emilio Umanzor (Jan-Mar 2013)
  Mauro Reyes (Apr 2013 – Apr 2014)

Old logos

See also

References

External links
 Website

Football clubs in Honduras
Association football clubs established in 1964
1964 establishments in Honduras
Santa Rosa de Copán